Mahendra Singh Yadav is an Indian politician. He is a Member of the Madhya Pradesh Legislative Assembly representing Kolaras for the Indian National Congress. He was first elected in the 2018 bypolls, after the death of his father Ram Singh Yadav.

Personal life
He is married to Rajkumari Yadav and has two sons (Lokendra Yadav and Jay Yadav) and two daughters (Neha Yadav And Megha Yadav).

See also
Madhya Pradesh Legislative Assembly

References

 https://hindi.oneindia.com/news/madhya-pradesh/congress-candidate-from-kolaras-mahendra-singh-yadav-defeated-in-his-wife-village-446359.html

External links

Madhya Pradesh MLAs 2018–2023
Indian National Congress politicians from Madhya Pradesh
Living people
1969 births